Petra Ujhelyi (born December 17, 1980) is a former professional basketball player for the WNBA and overseas.

South Carolina statistics
Source

International competition
Ujhelyi was a member of the following clubs/teams:

2009 EuroBasket Women	
2009 EuroBasket Women: DIVISION A
2007 EuroBasket Women: DIVISION A	
2005 EuroBasket Women: DIVISION A	
2001 European Championship for Women	
2000 European Championship for Young Women

Personal life
Ujhelyi's parents and older brother competed on Hungarian national teams. In college, she majored in business.

References

External links
Petra Ujhelyi WNBA Stats at Basketball-Reference.com
Petra Ujhelyi | EuroBasket Women 2015

1980 births
Living people
Centers (basketball)
Detroit Shock players
Hungarian expatriate basketball people in the United States
Hungarian expatriate basketball people in Spain
Hungarian expatriate basketball people in Italy
Hungarian expatriate basketball people in Poland
Hungarian expatriate basketball people in Turkey
Hungarian expatriate sportspeople in the United States
Hungarian women's basketball players
People from Nagykőrös
Phoenix Mercury draft picks
Power forwards (basketball)
South Carolina Gamecocks women's basketball players
Sportspeople from Pest County